Twenty Five is a greatest hits album by George Michael released in the UK on 13 November 2006, celebrating the 25th anniversary of his music career. It was released on 13 November 2006 by Sony BMG. It debuted at number one on the UK Albums Chart and number 23 on the Billboard 200, and it reached the top 20 on most other album charts. After Michael's death in December 2016, the album re-entered the Billboard 200 at a new peak position of number 12.

The album mostly contains songs from Michael's solo career, but also from his earlier days with Wham!. The album is sold in two formats: a 2-CD set and a limited edition 3-CD set. The 2-CD set contains 29 tracks, including four recorded with Wham! and three new songs: "An Easier Affair", "This Is Not Real Love" (a duet with the British singer Mutya Buena) and a new version of "Heal the Pain", recorded with Paul McCartney. The limited edition 3-CD version contains an additional 14 lesser known tracks, including one with Wham! and another new song called "Understand".

The 2-CD version was released in the United States on 1 April 2008, with two changes: "Feeling Good" replaced the Wham! track "Freedom", and "The First Time Ever I Saw Your Face" (from Songs from the Last Century) replaced "Round Here", a track from Patience that was not released as a single in the US.

A 3-CD limited deluxe version was released in the United States exclusively by Best Buy. The track listing for the third CD is the same as the international version, but unlike the 2-CD US version, it includes "Freedom" instead of "Feeling Good". The 3-CD version is packaged in a digipak. It includes a 36-page colour booklet with lyrics for every track, along with screen shots from the videos for most of the tracks on the first two CDs.

In 2010, a special tour edition of the album was released in Australia for his short three date George Michael Live in Australia tour. The track listing itself contained the same tracks as the international version alongside a bonus third disc.

A Twenty Five DVD was also released.

Track listing

International release

Disc 1: For Living
 "Everything She Wants (12" remix)" – 6:33  original version on Wham!'s album Make It Big
 "Wake Me Up Before You Go-Go" – 3:52  from Wham!'s album Make It Big
 "Freedom" – 5:20  from Wham!'s album Make It Big
 "Faith" – 3:15  from Faith
 "Too Funky" (Single Version) – 3:46  Extended Version appears on Red Hot + Dance
 "Fastlove" – 5:28  from Older
 "Freedom! '90" – 6:30  from Listen Without Prejudice Vol. 1
 "Spinning the Wheel" – 6:09  from Older
 "Outside" – 4:44  from Ladies & Gentlemen: The Best of George Michael
 "As" (with Mary J. Blige) – 4:43  from Ladies & Gentlemen: The Best of George Michael
 "Freeek!" (2002 single version) – 4:32  remixed version "Freeek! 04" appears on Patience
 "Shoot the Dog" – 5:08  from Patience (non-USA release)
 "Amazing" – 4:25  from Patience
 "Flawless (Go to the City)" (vs. The Ones) (Radio Edit) – 4:50  original version from Patience
 "An Easier Affair" – 4:38 Previously unreleased
 "Kissing a Fool" – 4:34  from Faith / Japanese bonus track

Disc 2: For Loving
"Careless Whisper" (Single Edit) – 5:04  original version from Wham!'s album Make It Big
"Last Christmas" (Single Edit) – 4:27  original version from Wham!'s album The Final
"A Different Corner" (Single Edit) – 4:03  from Wham!'s The Final
"Father Figure" – 5:40  from Faith
"One More Try" – 5:53  from Faith
"Praying for Time" – 4:41  from Listen Without Prejudice Vol. 1
"Heal the Pain" (with Paul McCartney) – 4:43  Previously unreleased version
"Don't Let the Sun Go Down on Me" (with Elton John) – 5:48  from John's album Duets
"Jesus to a Child" – 6:50  from Older
"Older" – 5:34  from Older
"Round Here" – 5:55  from Patience
"You Have Been Loved" – 5:28  from Older
"John and Elvis Are Dead" – 4:23  from Patience
"This Is Not Real Love" (with Mutya) – 4:56 Previously unreleased
"Club Tropicana" – 4:28  from Wham!'s album Fantastic / Japanese bonus track

Disc 3: For the Loyal (limited edition only)
 "Understand" – 5:56
 "Precious Box" – 7:36
 "Roxanne" – 4:10
 "Fantasy" – 5:02
 "Cars and Trains" – 5:51
 "Patience" – 2:52
 "You Know That I Want To" – 4:32
 "My Mother Had a Brother" – 6:19
 "If You Were There" – 3:43
 "Safe" – 4:25
 "American Angel" – 4:08
 "My Baby Just Cares for Me" – 1:43
 "Brother, Can You Spare a Dime?" – 4:27 (Performed at "Pavarotti and Friends")
 "Please Send Me Someone (Anselmo's Song)" – 5:25
 "Through" – 4:52

Digital download version (2 bonus tracks and 4 videos)
 "I'm Your Man" – 6:52
 "Edith & The Kingpin" – 3:41
 "I'm Your Man" – 3:59 (video)
 "John and Elvis Are Dead" – 4:23 (video)
 "An Easier Affair" – 4:31 (video)
 "Father Figure" – 5:34 (video)

North American release

Disc 1: For Living
 "Everything She Wants (12" remix)" – 6:33 original version on Wham!'s album Make It Big
 "Wake Me Up Before You Go-Go" – 3:52  from Wham!'s album Make It Big
 "Feeling Good" – 2:54 Previously unreleased
 "Faith" – 3:15  from Faith
 "Too Funky" – 3:46  from Red Hot + Dance
 "Fastlove" – 5:28  from Older
 "Freedom! '90" – 6:30  from Listen Without Prejudice Vol. 1
 "Spinning the Wheel" – 6:09  from Older
 "Outside" – 4:44  from Ladies & Gentlemen: The Best of George Michael
 "As" (with Mary J. Blige) – 4:43  from Ladies & Gentlemen: The Best of George Michael
 "Freeek!" – 4:32  from Patience
 "Shoot the Dog" – 5:08  from Patience
 "Amazing" – 4:25  from Patience
 "Flawless (Go to the City)" (vs. The Ones) – 4:50  from Patience
 "An Easier Affair" – 4:38 Previously unreleased

Disc 2: For Loving
"Careless Whisper" – 5:04  from Wham!'s album Make It Big
"Last Christmas" – 4:27  from Wham!'s album Music from the Edge of Heaven
"A Different Corner" – 4:03  from Wham!'s Music from the Edge of Heaven
"Father Figure" – 5:40  from Faith
"One More Try" – 5:53  from Faith
"Praying for Time" – 4:41  from Listen Without Prejudice Vol. 1
"Heal the Pain" (with Paul McCartney) – 4:43  Previously unreleased
"Don't Let the Sun Go Down on Me" (with Elton John) – 5:48  from John's album Duets
"Jesus to a Child" – 6:50  from Older
"Older" – 5:34  from Older
"The First Time Ever I Saw Your Face" – 5:19  from Songs from the Last Century
"You Have Been Loved" – 5:28  from Older
"John and Elvis Are Dead" – 4:23  from Patience
"This Is Not Real Love" (with Mutya) – 4:56 Previously unreleased

Disc 3: For the Loyal (Best Buy exclusive)
 "Understand" – 5:56
 "Precious Box" – 7:38
 "Roxanne" – 4:11
 "Fantasy" – 5:03
 "Cars and Trains" – 5:51
 "Patience" – 2:53
 "You Know That I Want To" – 4:32
 "My Mother Had a Brother" – 6:20
 "If You Were There" – 3:44
 "Safe" – 4:25
 "American Angel" – 4:09
 "My Baby Just Cares for Me" – 1:43
 "Brother, Can You Spare a Dime?" – 4:27 (performed at Pavarotti & Friends)
 "Please Send Me Someone (Anselmo's Song)" – 5:25
 "Through" – 4:55

2010 Australian release

Disc 3: Bonus 2010 Australian Tour Disc
 "Kissing A Fool" – 4:34
 "Feeling Good" – 2:54
 "My Baby Just Cares For Me" – 1:46
 "Roxanne" – 4:11
 "Club Tropicana" – 4:29
 "I'm Your Man (Extended Stimulation)" – 6:52

Charts

Weekly charts

Year-end charts

Certifications

References

2006 greatest hits albums
George Michael albums